F One may refer to:
 F One (album), a 2009 album by FanFan
 Formula One, a motorsport

See also
F1 (disambiguation)